Los Molinos is a locality located in the municipality of Arén, in Huesca province, Aragon, Spain. As of 2020, it has a population of 3.

Geography 
Los Molinos is located 143km east-northeast of Huesca.

References

Populated places in the Province of Huesca